The Friedrichshafen FF.2 was a floatplane built in Germany in 1913. It was derived from a design by the Swiss pilot and designer René Grandjean. Only one aircraft was built before the design was reworked into the Friedrichshafen FF.4 the following year.

Background and description
Grandjean licensed the design for one of his aircraft to Flugzeugbau Friedrichshafen which modified it as the FF.2. One aircraft was commissioned for a customer and it first flew sometime in 1913. Its ultimate fate is unknown.

The FF.2 was a single-seat monoplane with a pair of large floats attached to the forward fuselage with struts and a small one under the tail structure. It was powered by a  Oerlikon four-cylinder flat engine in a tractor configuration at the front of the fuselage. The engine was cooled by radiators positioned on the sides of the fuselage.

Specifications (FF.2)

References

Bibliography

Friedrichshafen aircraft
Floatplanes